Quinnimont is an unincorporated community in Fayette County, West Virginia, United States. Quinnimont had a post office, which opened on February 23, 1874, and closed on February 1, 1997.

The community was so named on account of there being five mountains near the town site.

References

Unincorporated communities in Fayette County, West Virginia
Unincorporated communities in West Virginia
Coal towns in West Virginia
New River Gorge National Park and Preserve